Craig Peter Johnston (born 25 June 1960) is a South African-born Australian former professional footballer. He played as a midfielder in the English Football League between 1977 and 1988, winning the European Cup, five league titles and an FA Cup (scoring in the 1986 final) with Liverpool. Nicknamed "Skippy", Johnston was a crowd favourite at Anfield, making 271 Liverpool appearances and scoring 40 goals. He was a key member of the 1986 "double" winning team. He also co-wrote the team's 1988 cup final song "Anfield Rap". He was eligible to play for England, Scotland, Australia and South Africa at international level, but only ever appeared for the England U21s.

After retiring, he designed and created the prototype for Adidas' Predator football boot, worn by many footballers and rugby players.

Childhood
Johnston was born in Johannesburg, South Africa to Australian parents; he returned home to Australia with his family as a small child. At the age of six, Johnston contracted osteomyelitis and came close to losing his leg and would have done if not for the expertise of an American specialist who was touring and lecturing in Australia at the time.

Encouraged by his father, who had trialled at Preston North End and Dundee United, Johnston took up soccer as a child, playing with Lake Macquarie City in Newcastle, New South Wales. At the age of 14, he wrote to four English clubs, among those Manchester United and Chelsea, seeking a trial. Middlesbrough, managed by Jack Charlton, replied and Johnston's parents sold their house to fund his ticket to England.

Career in England
Johnston made his first team debut for Middlesbrough, aged 17, in an FA Cup tie against Everton. His league debut came on 4 February 1978 in a 2–1 victory over Birmingham City at St Andrew's and he scored his first goal later that season in a 2–1 home league defeat to West Ham United. Johnston scored 16 goals in 64 games for Middlesbrough before moving to Liverpool in 1981 for £650,000

Johnston made his Liverpool debut in August 1981, coming on as sub for Ray Kennedy in the 1–0 league defeat to Wolverhampton Wanderers at Molineux. Johnston's first start came in the Intercontinental Cup fixture against Brazilian side Flamengo.

Johnston scored his first goal for Liverpool on 8 December 1981 against Arsenal at Anfield, during a League Cup fourth round replay. Johnston opened the scoring in the fifth minute of extra time in a 3–0 win. Johnston, known as Skippy, was a crowd favourite at Anfield during his long spell with the club. He worked under three managers – Bob Paisley, Joe Fagan and Kenny Dalglish – and, when picked, predominantly played on the right side of midfield. He made a total of 271 appearances for the club and scored 40 goals.

Johnston was part of the League championship-winning teams of 1982 and 1983 and gained a League Cup winner's medal in 1983. In 1984, Johnston was part of the team which won a treble of League championship, League Cup and European Cup. Two years later he was an integral part of the side which won only the third League championship and FA Cup "double" of the 20th century. In the 1986 FA Cup final at Wembley, Johnston scored Liverpool's second goal in a 3–1 win over Everton.

In 1988, he was a frequent substitute and occasional starter as Liverpool again won the League title and reached the FA Cup final, aiming to complete a second "double". Johnston wrote the club's traditional Cup final song called "Anfield Rap" which combined pro-Liverpool lyrics with the rap and house trends of the time, with other Liverpool players contributing.

His last two goals for the Reds came in the penultimate league game of the season, a 5–1 away win over Sheffield Wednesday. By this stage, Liverpool had wrapped up the 17th league title of their history.

International career
Johnston was approached by Jock Stein in the early 1980s with a view to him playing for Scotland as he was eligible through his father. Johnston declined Stein's offer and also resisted calls to play for his country Australia in 1981 and 1984. He instead chose to represent England at under-21 and 'B' team level. Early in his career in England he had described playing football for Australia as "like surfing for England." Johnston was also eligible to represent the South African national side due to being born there but was never approached or offered by the South African federation to play for them.

Johnston was called up to the full England squad in November 1987 but did not make an appearance at that level.

Retirement
After 271 appearances and 40 goals and just days before the 1988 FA Cup Final at Wembley against Wimbledon, Johnston incurred his manager's wrath when he announced his premature retirement from Liverpool. Kenny Dalglish was livid but later relented and gave his blessing to Johnston when he found out the reason for the player's decision.

Earlier that year Johnston's sister became seriously ill and was admitted to a hospital in Morocco. By the end of the season, it was clear she needed round the clock attention back home in Australia and Johnston wished to provide that care. He came on for his 271st appearance as a substitute for John Aldridge in the final (who had just seen his penalty saved with Liverpool a goal down) but ended up on the losing side. He never played for Liverpool again.

When the Hillsborough disaster occurred in 1989, a year after Johnston's departure, he raised funds  in Australia and also flew back to England to attend funerals and memorial services. He later dedicated his autobiography, titled Walk Alone, to the victims of the Heysel and Hillsborough disasters.

In 1991, when Graeme Souness was manager of Liverpool F.C., he asked Johnston if he would like to train with the team with a view to playing again. Liverpool F.C. still held Johnston's registration as a player. It didn't work out and Johnston moved on. However, Johnston possesses an undying love for Liverpool and its fans.  After his retirement he was constantly being linked to clubs from all over. Johnston always retorted this speculation stating that he could never play for anyone other than Liverpool.

Business career
After retiring from playing football, Johnston found success as a businessman and innovator, designing and creating the prototype for Adidas' Predator football boot, worn by many of the world's top players of both football and rugby including Zinedine Zidane, David Beckham, Steven Gerrard, Xavi, Jonny Wilkinson and Ronan O'Gara. He later designed another innovative boot called The Pig or, to give them their full title, the Patented Interactive Grip can come as a 'skin' that can be placed over the toe of an existing boot. Getting the first boot off the ground took Johnston 5 years and was initially refused by Adidas, as well as Nike and Reebok. However, Johnston had filmed Franz Beckenbauer using the boots in Germany in snowy conditions, and its increased grip led to Adidas agreeing to the proposal.

Johnston also invented the Traxion sole for football boots and the software program the 'Butler,' a device that shows what has been removed from minibars in hotel bedrooms. Johnston is also the creator of a gameshow called 'The Main Event.'

Johnston invested heavily in a football school idea for inner city children but failed to win expected business backing and went bankrupt. He was made temporarily homeless as a result.

Johnston has since forged a new career as a photographer.

Johnston was very critical about modern football boot designs, stating they are to blame for the recent spate of metatarsal injuries. He believed that the studs on the soles of the boots do not release quickly enough, meaning that they get stuck in the ground putting extra pressure on the players' already stressed knees, ankles and metatarsals. He also thought that the problem can be solved by designing a smaller stud that doesn't stick to the soil.

Other activities
Though he travels the world with his business interests, Johnston remains based in Australia. He has been recognised at home for his achievements in England. On 18 June 2006, Johnston made an appearance as a guest on The Footy Show World Cup Spectacular in Germany revealing information on his career.

During the 2006 poll 100 Players Who Shook The Kop compiled by the official Liverpool FC website, over 110,000 of the club's fans worldwide voted for their top 100 players of all time, with Johnston coming in a very respectable 59th.

During the 2010 FIFA World Cup, Johnston wrote a 12-page letter to FIFA president, Sepp Blatter, in which he collected all criticism by players and coaches of the controversial Adidas-produced Jabulani ball, risking his reputation, and expecting to be blacklisted by the conservative governing body as a result of this letter.

Honours
Football League First Division (5): 1981–82, 1982–83, 1983–84, 1985–86, 1987–88
FA Cup (1): 1985–86; runner-up: 1987–88
League Cup (2): 1982–83, 1983–84
FA Charity Shield (1): 1986
European Cup (1): 1983–84

Further reading

References

External links
 Official Liverpool FC profile
 Player profile at LFCHistory.net
 Middlesbrough seasonal record 1977/78-1980/81 at sporting-heroes.net
 Liverpool seasonal record (part 1) 1980/81-1983/84 at sporting-heroes.net
 Liverpool seasonal record (part 2) 1985/86-1987/88 at sporting-heroes.net
 http://soccernet.espn.go.com/columns/story?id=534666&root=global&cc=4716

1960 births
England under-21 international footballers
England B international footballers
Living people
National Soccer League (Australia) players
Liverpool F.C. players
Middlesbrough F.C. players
Australian people of Scottish descent
Australian emigrants to England
English people of Scottish descent
Australian soccer players
English footballers
Newcastle KB United players
Association football midfielders
21st-century Australian inventors
FA Cup Final players
Australian expatriate sportspeople in England